is a Japanese singer and actress, represented by the agency Amuse Inc. until March 2018. She is a former member of the idol group Sakura Gakuin and its sub-units Twinklestars, Sleepiece, and Minipati. She was the co-presenter of a live stream programme  with Yuika Shima until the series ended in September 2017.

Discography

With Sakura Gakuin 
Sakura Gakuin 2010 Nendo: Message (2011)
Sakura Gakuin 2011 Nendo: Friends (2012)
Sakura Gakuin 2012 Nendo: My Generation (2013)
Sakura Gakuin 2013 Nendo: Kizuna (2014)

Filmography

Films 
 Shindo (2007)
 Tengoku wa Mattekureru (2007)

TV drama 
 Chia Doru (2015)

References

External links 
 Amuse Inc. profile  
  

Sakura Gakuin members
1998 births
Living people
Japanese idols
Japanese women singers
Actresses from Tokyo
Amuse Inc. talents